Chūjirō, Chujiro or Chuujirou (written: 忠二郎 or 忠次郎) is a masculine Japanese given name. Notable people with the name include:

, Japanese baseball player
, Japanese naval surgeon and Reiki practitioner

Japanese masculine given names